Thomas Joseph Campbell (b. 1845 Maghery, County Armagh, Northern Ireland and d. 6 November 1885 in Townsville, Queensland) was a politician in colonial Queensland. He was a member of the Queensland Legislative Assembly from 1884 to 1885, representing the electorate of Cook.

Early life 
Campbell was the son of John and Catherine Campbell (née Johnson).

Politics 
In August 1883 at a public meeting in Mackay, Queensland, Campbell condemned the policies of the then Premier, Sir Thomas McIlwraith, and informed those present that he had great faith in Sir Samuel Griffith who was subsequently elected Premier of Queensland in November 1883.

Campbell was declared insolvent on 27 July 1885 and he tendered his resignation from the parliament. As had occurred on a previous occasion when a member was declared insolvent, it was thought proper for the Queensland Parliament to move that the seat be declared vacant by reason of the insolvency of the member. On 4 August 1885 the then Premier, Samuel Griffith, moved: "That the seat of Thomas Campbell hath become and is now vacant by reason of the insolvency of the said Thomas Campbell since his election and return to serve in this House as one of the members for the electoral district of Cook." The question was put and passed.

Later life 

Campbell died in Townsville at the Imperial Hotel on 6 November 1885, aged 40 when he was visiting North Queensland on a court case and was buried in the West End Cemetery in Townsville. According to The Gympie Times, "he had been laid up at the Imperial Hotel for three days with an attack of asthma, but on Friday he was seized with convulsive fits, which continued until his death, the cause of which is said to have been Bright's disease" and that he was "a fine scholar and a man of great natural ability and application - as is shown by the fact that whilst fulfilling his responsible scholastic duties, he, quite unaided, managed to qualify himself for admission to the bar".

Family

References

Members of the Queensland Legislative Assembly
1845 births
1885 deaths
19th-century Australian politicians